Petar Krasimirov Petrov (Bulgarian: Петър Красимиров Петров; born 9 March 1988) is a Bulgarian footballer who plays as a goalkeeper for FC Rheineck in the Swiss 3. Liga.

Career 
Petrov started playing football in his hometown club Montana and spent his youth there, but never played for the senior team.

His professional career began at Kom-Minyor after signing with the club in January 2010. As a third choice goalkeeper he managed to start in the last three league matches of the 2009–10 season and in another five in the following 2010–11. He made his debut in a league game against Pirin Gotse Delchev on 1 May 2010 without conceding a goal and securing the 2–0 win which helped the team to avoid relegation.

Petrov started playing for Kariana in the spring 2013–14 season and since he is a regular choice. In Kariana's first participation in the AFL Cup Petrov helped the team reach the North-west final, while in the First stage he saved a penalty in a 2:1 win over Kom Berkovitsa and completing a clean sheet and saving two penalties securing a win over Manastirishte 2000.

After a short spell with Varshets 2012, in July 2017 Petrov returned to Kariana.

In November 2018 Petrov moved to Switzerland and joined the 3. Liga(Group 2) leaders FC Rheineck. By the end of the season the club won promotion to 2. Liga finishing first as group champions.

Career statistics 
As of 1. May 2022.

Honours

Club 
Kariana Erden
 A OFG Montana: 2013–14, 2014–15

References 

1988 births
Living people
People from Montana, Bulgaria
Bulgarian footballers
Association football goalkeepers
PFC Kom-Minyor players
Second Professional Football League (Bulgaria) players